Cyrus, longer title Cyrus: Mind of a Serial Killer is a 2010 thriller horror film based on real events, written and directed by Mark Vadik and starring Brian Krause, Lance Henriksen and Danielle Harris.

Synopsis
The film shows an independent television reporter and her cameraman, part of a small independent news crew interviewing a man in regards to a serial killer the man knew by the name of 'Cyrus' dubbed 'The County Line Cannibal'. The man traces back through the story of the serial killer and why he became the monster he is.

Cast

References

External links

2010 films
2010 horror films
2010 horror thriller films
2010s serial killer films
American horror thriller films
American serial killer films
Films scored by Frederik Wiedmann
Films shot in Michigan
2010s English-language films
2010s American films